Arakura is a suburb of Wainuiomata, part of Lower Hutt city situated in the lower (southern) North Island of New Zealand.

Demographics

Arakura had a population of 2,793 at the 2018 New Zealand census, an increase of 348 people (14.2%) since the 2013 census, and an increase of 324 people (13.1%) since the 2006 census. There were 891 households. There were 1,380 males and 1,410 females, giving a sex ratio of 0.98 males per female. The median age was 31.8 years (compared with 37.4 years nationally), with 681 people (24.4%) aged under 15 years, 624 (22.3%) aged 15 to 29, 1,215 (43.5%) aged 30 to 64, and 270 (9.7%) aged 65 or older.

Ethnicities were 62.1% European/Pākehā, 35.1% Māori, 16.0% Pacific peoples, 8.6% Asian, and 2.8% other ethnicities (totals add to more than 100% since people could identify with multiple ethnicities).

The proportion of people born overseas was 17.2%, compared with 27.1% nationally.

Although some people objected to giving their religion, 50.8% had no religion, 34.7% were Christian, 2.6% were Hindu, 0.3% were Muslim, 0.6% were Buddhist and 4.0% had other religions.

Of those at least 15 years old, 228 (10.8%) people had a bachelor or higher degree, and 471 (22.3%) people had no formal qualifications. The median income was $29,700, compared with $31,800 nationally. The employment status of those at least 15 was that 1,095 (51.8%) people were employed full-time, 264 (12.5%) were part-time, and 120 (5.7%) were unemployed.

Education

References

Suburbs of Lower Hutt